Maval taluka is a taluka in Mawal subdivision of Pune district of state of Maharashtra in India.

At the time of the 2011 Census of India, the taluka comprised 187 villages, a figure that was unchanged from 2001. There were also three census towns at that time - Wadagaon, Khadkale and Kusgaon Budruk. The census towns had their own governing bodies, whilst the gram panchayats which governed the villages numbered 100; there were two villages - Ahirvade and Kamshet - which had no official governing body.

See also
 Talukas in Pune district
 List of villages in Mawal taluka

References

Further reading

Talukas in Pune district